Jovan Marković (born 23 March 2001) is a Romanian professional footballer who plays as a striker for Liga I club Universitatea Craiova.

Club career
Marković made his Liga I debut for Universitatea Craiova on 1 April 2017, aged 16, in a 1–4 home loss to CFR Cluj. His breakthrough came in the 2021–22 season, following a loan stint at Academica Clinceni, as he managed to score 13 goals from 44 games in all competitions.

International career
Marković made his debut for the Romania national team on 2 September 2021, in a 2–0 away victory over Iceland in the FIFA World Cup qualifiers.

Personal life
Marković was born in Belgrade to a Serbian father and a Romanian mother from Corabia, Olt County.

Career statistics

Club

International

Honours
Universitatea Craiova
Supercupa României: 2021; runner-up: 2018

References

External links

2001 births
Living people
Romanian people of Serbian descent
Footballers from Belgrade
People from Corabia
Romanian footballers
Association football forwards
Liga I players
CS Universitatea Craiova players
LPS HD Clinceni players
Romania youth international footballers
Romania international footballers
Romania under-21 international footballers